Taalgaon, also spelled Talgaon, is a village in Fatehpur mandal, Barabanki district, Uttar Pradesh, India.

Taalgaon Pin Code is 225407 and Post office name is Meermau, Rudauli.

References

Villages in Barabanki district